Frederick Hubbard Gwynne (July 10, 1926 – July 2, 1993) was an American actor, artist, and author widely known for his roles in the 1960s television sitcoms  Car 54, Where Are You? as Francis Muldoon and as Herman Munster in The Munsters, as well as his later film roles in The Cotton Club, Pet Sematary, and My Cousin Vinny.

Early life

Gwynne was born on July 10, 1926, in New York City, the son of Frederick Walker Gwynne, a partner in the securities firm Gwynne Brothers, and his wife Dorothy Ficken Gwynne, who, before her marriage, was a successful artist known for her "Sunny Jim" comic character. His paternal grandfather Walker Gwynne was an Anglican priest, born in Camus, County Tyrone, Ireland around 1846, who married American Helen Lea Bowers. His maternal grandfather H. Edwards Ficken was an emigrant from London, who married American Josephine or Josephina Preston Hubbard.

He had at least two siblings, Dorothy Gwynne and Bowers Gwynne, who both died young. Although Gwynne grew up in Tuxedo Park, New York, he spent most of his childhood in South Carolina, Florida, and Colorado because his father traveled extensively. He attended the Groton School.

During World War II, Gwynne served in the United States Navy as a radioman on a submarine chaser. In the 1940s, Gwynne was a summertime swimming instructor at the Duxbury Yacht Club pool in Duxbury, Massachusetts. He later studied art under the G.I. Bill before attending Harvard, where he was affiliated with Adams House, graduating in 1951. He was a member of the Fly Club, sang with the a cappella group the Harvard Krokodiloes, was a cartoonist for the Harvard Lampoon (eventually becoming its president), and acted for the Hasty Pudding Theatricals.

Career
Gwynne joined the Brattle Theatre Repertory Company after his 1951 graduation, then moved to New York City. To support himself, Gwynne worked as a copywriter for J. Walter Thompson, resigning in 1952 upon being cast in his first Broadway role, a gangster in a comedy called Mrs. McThing starring Helen Hayes.

Another early role was a New York City Drama Company production at City Center of Shakespeare's Love's Labour's Lost in 1953, in the role of Dull, a constable.

In 1954, he made his first cinematic appearance playing – in an uncredited role – the laconic character Slim in the Oscar-winning film On the Waterfront. Shortly afterwards, Phil Silvers sought him for his television show because he had been impressed by Gwynne's comedic work in Mrs. McThing. As a result, Gwynne made a memorable appearance on The Phil Silvers Show in the episode "The Eating Contest" as the character Corporal Ed Honnergar, whose depressive eating binges are exploited in an eating contest.

Gwynne's second appearance on The Phil Silvers Show (in the episode "It's for the Birds") and appearances on many other shows led writer-producer Nat Hiken to cast him in the sitcom Car 54, Where Are You? as Patrolman Francis Muldoon.

Gwynne was 6 ft 5 in (1.96 m) tall, an attribute that contributed to his being cast as Herman Munster, a goofy parody of Frankenstein's monster, in the sitcom The Munsters. For his role, he had to wear 40 or 50 lbs of padding, makeup, and 4-inch asphalt-spreader boots. His face was painted a bright violet because it captured the most light on the black-and-white film. Gwynne was known for his sense of humor and retained fond recollections of Herman, saying in later life, "I might as well tell you the truth. I love old Herman Munster. Much as I try not to, I can't stop liking that fellow."

After his iconic role in The Munsters, Gwynne found himself typecast, unable to gain new film roles for over two years. In 1969, he was cast as Jonathan Brewster in a television production of Arsenic and Old Lace. (The Brewster character originally was played by Boris Karloff in the Broadway production of the play; Karloff famously played Frankenstein's monster on which Gwynne's Herman Munster character was based.) Gwynne then found success as a stage actor in regional state productions across the United States while maintaining a low Hollywood profile.

A talented vocalist, Gwynne sang in a Hallmark Hall of Fame television production The Littlest Angel (1969), and went on to perform in a variety of roles on stage and screen. In 1974, drawing upon his own Southern roots, he appeared in the role of Big Daddy Pollitt in the Broadway revival of Cat on a Hot Tin Roof with Elizabeth Ashley, Keir Dullea and Kate Reid. In 1975, he played the Stage Manager in Our Town at the American Shakespeare Theatre in Stratford, Connecticut.

From 1975 to 1982, Gwynne appeared in 82 episodes in different roles on the popular radio drama series, the CBS Radio Mystery Theater, produced and directed by Himan Brown. He returned to Broadway in 1976 as Colonel J.C. Kinkaid in two parts of A Texas Trilogy. In 1984, Gwynne auditioned for the part of Henry on the sitcom Punky Brewster, then withdrew in frustration when a director identified him as Herman Munster rather than by his real name. The role of Henry went to George Gaynes. In 1987, Gwynne starred in the short-lived TV series Jake's M.O., where he played an investigative reporter.

Gwynne's performance as Jud Crandall in Pet Sematary was based on author Stephen King, who is only an inch shorter than the actor, and uses a similarly thick Maine dialect. The character's likeness and accent, as played by Gwynne, have been used in a number of episodes of the animated show South Park, beginning in 2001 and as recently as 2019. Gwynne also had roles in the movies Simon, On the Waterfront, So Fine, Disorganized Crime, The Cotton Club, Captains Courageous, The Secret of My Success, Water, Ironweed, Fatal Attraction, and The Boy Who Could Fly. Despite his misgiving about having been typecast, he agreed to reprise the role of Herman Munster for the 1981 TV reunion movie The Munsters' Revenge. Gwynne played Judge Chamberlain Haller in his last film, the 1992 comedy My Cousin Vinny.

As painter and illustrator
In addition to his acting career, Gwynne sang professionally, painted, and wrote and illustrated children's books, including Best in Show (later titled It's Easy to See Why), Daddy Has a Mole on His Nose, A Chocolate Moose for Dinner, The King Who Rained, Pondlarker, The Battle of the Frogs and Mice, and A Little Pigeon Toad. Many of these efforts were based on children's frequent misperceptions of things they hear from adults, such as the "chocolate moose for dinner", illustrated as a large brown antlered quadruped seated at the dinner table. The other books on this theme were The King Who Rained, A Little Pigeon Toad (in which a child's mother thus describes her father), and The Sixteen Hand Horse.

Perhaps one of the reasons the books did not achieve wider popularity initially was the fact that their format was geared to a very young audience, but the concept was more appealing to older children and adults, achieving critical success and eventually becoming regular bestsellers for their publisher. He also lent his voice talents to TV and radio commercials. Later in his career, he held a number of shows of his artwork, the first in 1989.

Personal life
In 1952, Gwynne married socialite Jean "Foxy" Reynard, a granddaughter of New York City mayor William Jay Gaynor. Before divorcing in 1980, the couple had five children: Kieron (son, b. 1953 / d. 1998); Gaynor (daughter, b. 1954); Evan (son, b. 1956); Dylan (son, 1962–1963, drowning); and Madyn (daughter, b. 1965).

In 1988, Gwynne married his second wife Deborah Flater. They remained married until his death in 1993.

Death
Gwynne died of complications from pancreatic cancer, in the cigar room at his home in Taneytown, Maryland, on July 2, 1993, eight days short of his 67th birthday. He is buried in an unmarked grave at Sandy Mount United Methodist Church Cemetery in Finksburg, Maryland.

Filmography

Film

Television

Theatre

References

External links

1926 births
1993 deaths
American male film actors
American male television actors
American male stage actors
American people of English descent
American people of Northern Ireland descent
Groton School alumni
The Harvard Lampoon alumni
Deaths from pancreatic cancer
Male actors from New York City
Deaths from cancer in Maryland
Burials in Maryland
20th-century American male actors
20th-century Methodists
American United Methodists
Hasty Pudding alumni
United States Navy personnel of World War II
United States Navy sailors